Events from the year 1780 in Canada.

Incumbents
Monarch: George III

Governors
Governor of the Province of Quebec: Frederick Haldimand
Governor of Nova Scotia: Lord William Campbell
Commodore-Governor of Newfoundland: John Byron
Governor of St. John's Island: Walter Patterson

Events
 May 19 – an unusual darkening of the day sky was observed over the New England states and parts of Canada. This has never been explained, though clouds of smoke from massive forest fires are the most likely cause.
 Quakers begin the Underground Railroad to smuggle slaves to freedom in Canada.

Births
August 15 – Marie-Anne Gaboury, female explorer (d.1875)
September 17 – Norman McLeod, Presbyterian minister (d.1866)
November 16 – James FitzGibbon, British colonel who served in Canada for 45 years (d.1863) 
December 1 – Edward Bowen, lawyer, judge and politician (d.1866)

Deaths
November 28 – Esther Wheelwright, mother superior for Quebec Ursulines

Historical documents

American Revolutionary War
New Englanders write to Halifax friends of "their most earnest wishes for[...]tranquillity" and John Dickinson calls peace with honour "the universal wish"

U.S.A. insolvent? - "Miserably deranged State of our public Affairs[...]pervades Into every quarter[;] public officers are without money and without Credit"

Cartoon: King George and Indigenous people consume white child while sailor delivers "Scalping Knives; Crucifixes; Tomahawks" (Note: racial stereotypes)

Schuyler advises Washington to make peace with Indigenous people in case "Reduction of Canada" is planned (Note: "savages," "barbarians" used)

Board of War wants Wheelocks of Dartmouth College paid for supporting Indigenous youth from Canada as part of friendship policy (Note: "savages" used)

To distract British from New York City attack, Washington favours spurring Canadians to assist France and U.S.A. in Canada (Note: "savages" used)

Huron-Wendat John Vincent reports Canadians say if U.S. invades they will drop neutral stance of "Priests and Gentlemen" and field 10,000 soldiers

Congressional committee reports "Canadians who from an attachment to our cause have left their own country appear to be greatly distressed" for food

"One thousand tons of shipping are ordered to be taken up by the [Royal] Navy Board to carry timber, cordage, and naval stores to Halifax"

Guy Johnson visits new Seneca settlement on Buffalo River and meets with Seneca, Onondaga and Lenape chiefs about their peoples' great needs

Oneida report that John Butler and Joseph Brant intend to lead 700-800 fighters down Mohawk River to cut off grain-growing area (Note: "savages" used)

2,000 British regular, Canadian, loyalist and Indigenous fighters in two groups raid New York via lakes Oneida and George (Note: "savages" used)

Schuyler unhappy Rochambeau won't invade Canada, as number of troops needed for that will instead have to guard New Hampshire to Virginia frontiers

Schuyler has intelligence that Canada had good harvest and Indigenous people "have been Generally out with the british parties" but Canadians have not

Jefferson details planned offensive to counter frontier attacks, including taking Detroit and control of Lake Erie to block "dangerous extension" of Canada

HMS Hind brings in Salem, Mass. privateer Harlequin, described as "a fine new Ship, in every respect calculated for a Privateer, and sails remarkably fast"

Report Henry Laurens captured going to Holland to get loan in return for mortgage on New York, which writer compares to U.S. offering Canada to France

Queen's Loyal Rangers officer, captured at Bennington and paroled, asks Gov. Haldimand for job to end his "want of Cloathing & other necessaries"

Leaving Butler's Rangers in 1780, George Cockel takes family to Niagara but does not receive any land before he dies in 1784; his widow later reapplies

Canada
Haldimand and Council consider "the Canadians as the People of the Country" and in making laws, "Regard is to be paid to[...]60,000 rather than[...]2,000"

Council prohibits export of wheat, pease, oats, biscuit, flour, or meal as well as horned cattle "to reduce the present high price of wheat and flour"

Haldimand on why wheat and flour prices are so high and Council's disputes over fixing prices and fees (as many members are in conflict of interest)

$100 offered for information leading to conviction of those "Clipping, Mutilating and Debasing the Currency" including new money sent from England

Ordinance lists government fees ranging from £6 for seal on patent or grant of new seigneury to 2p for clerk's entry in court books of cause under £10

Case of Montrealer Pierre ("Peter") Du Calvet and his unjust imprisonment for four years, at first falsely and then supposedly out of Gov. Haldimand's spite

Ann Cannon alias Ross passed as single and married William Stapleton, eloped within 3 months with £15 in clothing and now lives with Richard Cannon

Elizabeth Ogden passed as widow and married Robert Bradley, who is "now convinc'd her husband Ogden is living," and therefore marriage null and void

Young ladies to receive instruction in reading, writing, arithmetic, French and English grammar etc.; also dance school "with two Public Balls every Month"

Young Canadians perform comedy Gregoire, or l'Incommodité de la Grandeur, "and the compliments paid[...]reflect the highest honour on the Nation"

Harpsichord teacher offers lessons at his lodgings or student's and advertises concert at British Coffeehouse, Lower Town, Quebec City, tickets $1

Books for sale in Lower Town shop include psalm books for Church of England and Scotland, Biographia Britannica, Ovid, Swift, Rousseau, Hoyle etc. etc.

Reward offered for return to Levy Solomons of "a fine stately Canadian Horse, about five years old, with a white front, a Goose rump[...]and a long tail"

Nova Scotia
Nova Scotia has "flourished in consequence of the present rebellion," with one Bay of Fundy farmer quadrupling his "gross produce" in four years

"Every public attention to the education of youth is of the utmost importance in society" - Assembly provides for Halifax schoolhouse and teachers

As it goes on duty, Halifax militia regiment reminds public that all males 16-60 must enlist with arms and ammunition, even those exempt from training

"To be Sold, For no Fault, a lickely [(likely)] Negro Girl, About 14 years of Age, Enquire of the Printer of this Paper"

Pedestrians ask carriole drivers not to force them into snow banks when passing, "whereas it is[...]the duty of the Carrioleers, to give way to the Walkers"

Boy "was cut for a Stone in the Bladder by Doctor Wyer, one of a considerable Size was extracted and the Child is now, we hear, in a fair way to do well"

Scrivener offers services for petitions, letters etc., and will help business people "draw out their Accounts," and teach "Gentlemen's Children" to write

Halifax baker will take in ready-formed loaves, pies, puddings and meat dishes to bake for customers at 1-3 pence per loaf or dish

Halifax shop has breeches of English buck and doe skin, caribou and moose skin, shammy lining skins, and leather for belts, slings and knapsacks

Young gentleman seeks marriage with "young lady[...]whose happiness may center in domestic felicity and a moderate share of fashionable amusements"

Critic of "Abbé Reynais" Acadia history shows mistakes, says he relies on misinformation and displays "prejudices as a Frenchman and Roman Catholic"

Painting: Cape Sharp and Minas Basin, Nova Scotia

Elsewhere
Shipwrecked on northern Cape Breton Island, narrator and others travel 3 winter months to where Indigenous people save them (Note: "savages" used)

"For Sale; One half of a fishing Post on the Coast of Labrador near the streights of Belle Isle, known by the name of the River du Plaine."

References 

 
Canada
80